Ilan Daniel Feldman is an American Orthodox Jewish rabbi, public speaker and author. Since 1991 he has been the senior rabbi and spiritual leader of Congregation Beth Jacob of Atlanta, Georgia, succeeding his father, Rabbi Dr. Emanuel Feldman, who founded and led the congregation for 39 years. Over the past 20 years Feldman has built on his father's work, bringing a community kollel to the city and nurturing the growth of Atlanta as one of the leading centers for Orthodox Jewish life in America. He is also a founding board member of the Association for Jewish Outreach Programs (AJOP).

Early life
Feldman was born in Atlanta to Rabbi Dr. Emanuel Feldman and his wife, Estelle, who arrived in that city as newlyweds in 1952 to assume the roles of Rabbi and Rebbetzin of Congregation Beth Jacob. At that time, the synagogue was home to 40 families, only two of whom were Shomer Shabbat. Over the next four decades, the couple brought hundreds of families closer to Torah observance, helped build a Hebrew academy and Torah day school, and established a nationally recognized kosher certification organization.

Although he was the rabbi's son, the young Ilan was more interested in politics than the rabbinate. Like his father, he studied at Yeshivas Ner Yisroel of Baltimore, Maryland and was a talmid of rosh yeshiva Rabbi Yaakov Weinberg. In 1976 Feldman married the rosh yeshiva's daughter, Miriam. The couple has eight children.

Assistant rabbi
In 1980 Feldman decided to join his father as assistant rabbi of Congregation Beth Jacob. In addition to his synagogue duties, he assisted his father in the development of the Torah Day School of Atlanta, which opened in 1985.

Atlanta Scholars Kollel
On his own initiative, the younger Feldman founded the Atlanta Summer Kollel (later renamed the Atlanta Scholars Kollel) in 1987. Feldman secured funding for the project from Torah Umesorah, and brought in three graduates of Yeshivas Ner Yisroel as the first rabbis. Unlike the prevailing community kollel concept which viewed the kollel as an "inreach" organization serving its own, already-committed members, ASK is an outreach program that brings Jewish knowledge and commitment directly to the doorsteps of Orthodox, Conservative, and Reform Jews in Atlanta. ASK rabbis spend only 3 to 4 hours per day on their personal Torah learning and devote the rest of their day to "lunch 'n learn" classes, Hebrew reading crash courses, beginners minyans, campus outreach, and study groups for women, teens and singles. ASK has become a model for other community kollels in the United States. The kollel now has 11 full-time rabbis and 3 part-time women teachers who educate more than 1,000 men, women, students, teens and singles monthly.

Upon his father's retirement in 1991, Rabbi Ilan Feldman was elected senior rabbi by the synagogue's board of directors.

Leadership
Feldman has perpetuated the outreach work his father began. Congregation Beth Jacob now exceeds 500 families, and the Orthodox community, centered around the synagogue's location in Toco Hills, is now attracting more Torah-observant families from New York, Baltimore and other cities to relocate here. Besides nurturing his congregants' growth in religious observance, Feldman stresses the importance of taking responsibility for non-religious Jews and making visitors to Atlanta feel welcome.

Feldman serves as the dean of the Atlanta Kashruth Commission, which was founded by his father in the 1960s. Today this agency certifies nearly 150 companies, manufacturing plants, bakeries, supermarkets, restaurants, hotels, and caterers nationwide, and is considered one of the most reliable kosher-certification organizations.

Feldman is also the head of a rabbinical court recognized by the Chief Rabbinate of Israel as a reliable conversion authority.
  
As the rabbi of one of the leading Orthodox Jewish communities in the United States, Feldman frequently speaks out on key issues. These include: Jewish conversion, Christian missionizing of Jews, Sabbath desecration, and Jewish burial. For his congregants, Feldman reserves one Shabbat a year to speak about everything he loves about them, and one Shabbat a year to offer gentle criticism for how they can improve.
 
Feldman has served as a spiritual advisor for the Atlanta branch of the Jewish Alcoholics, Chemically Dependent Persons and Significant Others (JACS) support network. He also answers questions in the "Adviceline" column in Mishpacha Magazine.

Miriam Feldman
Feldman's wife, Miriam, is a full partner in his synagogue and community work. Like her husband, she is a popular speaker for groups; the two have even appeared as "scholars in residence" on a cruise ship. She has also taped many audio shiurim (Torah lectures) for Torah Media Atlanta.

Holder of a bachelor's degree from Yavne Teacher's College and Notre Dame University, and a master's degree from Loyola University, she was one of the first four teachers of the Torah Day School of Atlanta, which opened with 19 students in 1985 and which today boasts more than 300 students. In 1996 she opened the first girls-only high school in the South, the Temima High School for Girls, a Bais Yaakov-type school at which she is principal. For this achievement, she was named one of the "50 Most Influential Jews in America" by Jewsweek, placing 13th on the magazine's list.

On the occasion of Rabbi Feldman's tenth anniversary in office, the Georgia General Assembly passed House Resolution 131EX2 commending both Rabbi Ilan and Miriam Feldman for their contributions to their synagogue and the community at large.

References

External links
"Parking Lot Minyan" by Rabbi Ilan D. Feldman
"Super Choice" by Rabbi Ilan D. Feldman

American Haredi rabbis
American Orthodox rabbis
Writers from Atlanta
Living people
Year of birth missing (living people)
20th-century American rabbis
21st-century American rabbis